Asthamikkatha Pakalukal is a 1981 Indian Malayalam film,  directed by A. Sheriff and produced by Kurian Varnasala. The film stars Prem Nazir, Jose, Sankaradi and Sukumaran in the lead roles. The film has musical score by A. T. Ummer.

Cast
Prem Nazir
Jose
Sankaradi
Sukumaran
Aboobacker
Ambika
K. P. Ummer
Kuthiravattam Pappu
Meena
Bhaskaran Variyathuvalappil

Soundtrack
The music was composed by A. T. Ummer and the lyrics were written by Sathyan Anthikkad.

References

External links
 

1981 films
1980s Malayalam-language films